The Satellite Award for Outstanding Puzzle/Strategy Game was an annual award given by the International Press Academy as one of its Satellite Awards from 2004 to 2008.

Winners and nominees

References

External links
 International Press Academy website

Puzzle/Strategy Game